The track and field competition at the 2015 Military World Games was held from 4–11 October 2015 at the KAFAC Sports Complex in Mungyeong. The stadium is named after the Korea Armed Forces Athletic Corps. The marathon races took place on 11 October and followed a route around the city with a finish point at the track and field main stadium. A number of para-athletics exhibition events were added to the programme for the first time, covering men's and women's shot put, and track races over 100 m, 200 m, and 1500 m for men.

The programme expanded to contain 40 athletics events – a new high. In track and field there were 20 events for men and 18 for women, while the marathon had individual and team aspects for both sexes (the team format being a new addition). Men's hammer throw, women's 400 metres hurdles, high jump and shot put all returned to the programme after being dropped at the previous edition. Women's discus throw made its debut at the games. The women's 10,000 metres was not contested on this occasion, however.

After an absence from the 2011 games, Russia returned and topped the medal table in the sport for the third time in its history. It sent a full strength team and came away with ten gold medals among a haul of nineteen. Bahrain has its most successful edition in clear second place with six golds and twelve medals in total (all its medallists were African-born). China had the third highest gold medals, with four, while Poland had the third greatest medal total at ten. Thirty nations reached the medal table. The host nation won one medal – a gold courtesy of men's pole vaulter Jin Min-sub.

A total of twelve games records were broken or equalled in the athletics competitions. Two athletes defended their 2011 titles: men's javelin thrower Ari Mannio and women's hammer thrower Zhang Wenxiu. It was Zhang's fourth successive gold medal, retaining her position as the only woman to win the event since its introduction in 2003, and she also improved the games record for a fourth time straight. The only athlete to win two individual titles, Ekaterina Koneva claimed a horizontal jumps double for Russia. Rosângela Santos won the most medals with a 100 metres individual and relay title double as well as a 200 metres bronze.

Four champions from the 2015 World Championships in Athletics were in attendance. Russia's Sergey Shubenkov (110 m hurdles) and Mariya Kuchina (high jump) won their disciplines, but Maryna Arzamasava (800 m) and Piotr Małachowski (discus throw) were both beaten into runner-up spots on the world military stage. Seventeen-year-old World Youth champion Salwa Eid Naser became the youngest winner of the women's 400 m title.

Records

Medal summary

Men

Women

Medal table

References

Results
Track & Field. Korea2015MWG. Retrieved on 2015-10-09.
Track & Field Medallists by Event. Korea2015MWG. Retrieved on 2015-10-09.
Track & Field Medal Standings. Korea2015MWG. Retrieved on 2015-10-09.
Records
New Records. Korea2015MWG. Retrieved on 2015-10-09.

External links
Official website (archived)

 
Military World Games
2015 Military World Games
2015
2015 Military World Games